Krushna is a Hindic name, a variant of Krishna. It may refer to the following notable people:
Krushna Abhishek (born 1983), Indian film actor and comedian
Krushna Chandra Gajapati (1892–1974), Indian politician
Krushna Chandra Kar (1907–1995), Indian poet and literary critic
Krushna Ghoda (1953–2015), Indian politician